Notre-Dame is a settlement in New Brunswick around the intersection of Route 115 and Route 535 on the Cocagne River.

History

Notable people

See also
List of communities in New Brunswick

References

Communities in Kent County, New Brunswick